Bansda State was one of the princely states of India during the period of the British Raj. It was under the Surat Agency of the Bombay Presidency.

See also
 Bombay Presidency

References

External links

Princely states of Gujarat
1781 establishments in India
1948 disestablishments in India
States and territories established in 1781
Navsari district